Den yttersta tiden is the debut EP by the Christian black metal band Admonish. The EP was recorded in 2004 and the cover art was done by Sean Palomino of Digital Extremist Studios. According to MusicMight.com, the EP was "ironically" released on April 11, 2005 following a release concert at Sweden's Club 666, sharing the stage with Frosthardr and Slechtvalk. The EP got positive reviews, and the cover art had a mixed reception as, for example, The Whipping Post mentioned it being "interesting for an extreme metal release."

Track listing

 "Epiphany" - 7:50
 "Den yttersta tiden" (translation: "The Ultimate Time") - 6:01
 "Var inte rädd" (translation: "Be Not Afraid") - 3:44

Line-up
Jonas Karlsson - bass
Robin Svedman - drums, backing vocals
Emil Karlsson - guitar
Martin Norén - vocals
Emanuel Wärja - vocals, guitar

References

2005 debut EPs
Admonish (band) albums